This is a comprehensive list of victories of the  cycling team. The races are categorized according to the UCI rules.

2005 – Team Bigla
 National Time Trial Championship, Zoulfia Zabirova
 National Road Race Championship, Zoulfia Zabirova
 Overall Giro d'Italia Donne, Nicole Brändli
Prologue, Stages 1 & 7, Nicole Brändli
Prologue Giro di San Marino, Zoulfia Zabirova
GP di San Marino, Zoulfia Zabirova

2006 – Bigla Cycling Team

Berner Rundfahrt, Zoulfia Zabirova
Rund um den Bühler, Bettina Kühn
Diessenhofen, Bettina Kühn
Thun, Monika Furrer
Parel van de Veluwel, Monica Holler
Stage 3 Giro del Trentino Alto Adige-Südtirol, Andrea Grau
Stage 1 Giro d'Italia Donne, Nicole Brändli
Stage 2 Route de France Féminine, Noemi Cantele
 Overall Trophée d'Or Féminin, Zoulfia Zabirova
Stage 1, Zoulfia Zabirova
Stage 6, Noemi Cantele
GP de Plouay – Bretagne, Nicole Brändli
Hammarö Rundan, Monica Holler
Stages 2a, 4a & 6 Giro della Toscana Int. Femminile, Noemi Cantele
Stage 3 Giro della Toscana Int. Femminile, Nicole Brändli

2007 – Bigla Cycling Team

Brissago, Noemi Cantele
GP Raiffeisen, Noemi Cantele
Berner Rundfahrt, Jennifer Hohl
Diessenhofen, Andrea Wölfer
Tjejtrampet, Monica Holler
Thun, Bettina Kühn
 Overall Laxå 3-dagars, Monica Holler
Stages 1, 2a & 3b, Monica Holler
Wetzikon, Andrea Knecht
Stage 5 Giro d'Italia Femminile, Nicole Brändli
Diessenhofen, Bettina Kühn
Olten, Sereina Trachsel
Södra Hestra Sparbanks GP, Monica Holler
Västboloppet, Monica Holler
Elgg Criterium, Andrea Wölfer
Stage 3 Albstadt, Monica Holler
 Overall Trophée d'Or Féminin, Noemi Cantele
Stage 1, Noemi Cantele
Stage 2, Nicole Brändli
GP de Plouay – Bretagne, Noemi Cantele
Horgen, Sereina Trachsel
Union Race Open, Monica Holler
 Overall Giro della Toscana Int. Femminile, Noemi Cantele
Stages 2a & 3, Noemi Cantele

2008 – Bigla Cycling Team

Brissago, Nicole Brändli
Giro del Lago Maggiore — GP Knorr, Nicole Brändli
GP Città di Cornaredo, Andrea Graus
Rund um Schönaich, Veronica Andréasson
GP Costa Etrusca, Noemi Cantele
Diessenhofen, Andrea Wölfer
Berner Rundfahrt, Sereina Trachsel
Leo Wirth Strassenrennen, Nicole Brändli
Cham, Andrea Thürig
Stages 3 & 7 Tour de l'Aude Cycliste Féminin, Zoulfia Zabirova
Thun, Andrea Wölfer
Stage 3 Giro del Trentino Alto Adige-Südtirol, Andrea Thürig
Stage 3 Thüringen-Rundfahrt der Frauen, Noemi Cantele
Olten, Andrea Wölfer
Kirchdorf, Sereina Trachsel
Bern, Sereina Trachsel
Östgötaloppet, Monica Holler
Frenkendorf, Bettina Kühn
Horgen, Sereina Trachsel
Stage 6 Giro della Toscana Int. Femminile, Monica Holler

2009 – Bigla Cycling Team

Giro del Lago Maggiore — GP Knorr, Noemi Cantele
Brissago, Noemi Cantele
GP de Chambéry le Vieux, Modesta Vžesniauskaitė
GP Raiffeisen, Nicole Brändli
Thun, Bettina Kühn
Emakumen Saria, Noemi Cantele
Stage 5 Giro d'Italia Femminile, Noemi Cantele
Stage 1 Trophée d'Or Féminin, Monica Holler
Meisterschaft von Zürich, Jennifer Hohl
Memorial Davide Fardelli, Karin Thürig
Giornata Rosa di Nove, Noemi Cantele
Stage 1 (TTT) Giro della Toscana Int. Femminile, Bettina Kühn, Noemi Cantele, Monica Holler, Jennifer Hohl, Nicole Brändli & Modesta Vžesniauskaitė

2012 – Bigla Cycling Team
Berner Rundfahrt, Caroline Baur
Overall Albstadt, Caroline Baur
Diessenhofen, Nicole Hanselmann

2013 – Bigla Cycling Team
Oberwangen, Emma Pooley
Berner Rundfahrt, Nicole Hanselmann
Luzern, Emma Pooley
Diessenhofen, Désirée Ehrler
 Overall Tour Languedoc Roussillon, Emma Pooley
Stage 3, Emma Pooley
Cham, Nicole Hanselmann
Stages 3 & 5 Czech Tour, Emma Pooley

2014 – Bigla Cycling Team
Wanze Road Race, Joanne Hogan
Stage 3a Energiewacht Tour, Vera Koedooder
GP Osterhas, Jacqueline Hahn
Berner Rundfahrt, Elke Gebhardt
Cham-Hagendorn, Elke Gebhardt
Stage 6 Internationale Thüringen Rundfahrt der Frauen, Elke Gebhardt
Rund um den Born, Désirée Ehrler
Riehen Criterium, Joanne Hogan

2015 – Bigla Cycling Team
 Overall Auensteiner–Radsporttage, Ashleigh Moolman
Stage 3, Ashleigh Moolman
Prologue Emakumeen Euskal Bira, Annemiek van Vleuten
Prologue Giro d'Italia Femminile, Annemiek van Vleuten
Stage 4 Thüringen Rundfahrt der Frauen, Lotta Lepistö
Prologue Giro della Toscana Int. Femminile – Memorial Michela Fanini, Annemiek van Vleuten

2016 – Cervélo–Bigla Pro Cycling

Prologue Euskal Emakumeen Bira, Lotta Lepistö
Stage 1 Festival Elsy Jacobs, Lotta Lepistö
SwissEver GP Cham – Hagendorn, Lotta Lepistö
 Overall Auensteiner–Radsporttage, Ashleigh Moolman
Stage 2b, Ashleigh Moolman
Stage 5 Women's Tour, Lotta Lepistö
White Spot / Delta Road Race, Joëlle Numainville
Stage 1 Ladies Tour of Norway, Nicole Hanselmann
 Overall Giro della Toscana Int. Femminile – Memorial Michela Fanini, Ashleigh Moolman
 Points classification, Ashleigh Moolman
Prologue & Stage 2, Ashleigh Moolman

2017 – Cervélo–Bigla Pro Cycling

 Overall Setmana Ciclista Valenciana, Cecilie Uttrup Ludwig
 Youth classification, Cecilie Uttrup Ludwig
 Youth classification Healthy Ageing Tour, Lisa Klein
Dwars Door Vlaanderen, Lotta Lepistö
Gent–Wevelgem, Lotta Lepistö
Prologue Festival Elsy Jacobs, Ashleigh Moolman
 Overall Emakumeen Bira, Ashleigh Moolman
 Points classification, Ashleigh Moolman
 Mountains classification, Ashleigh Moolman
La Classique Morbihan, Ashleigh Moolman
Grand Prix de Plumelec-Morbihan Dames, Ashleigh Moolman
 Youth classification Giro d'Italia Femminile, Cecilie Uttrup Ludwig
Stage 6, Lotta Lepistö
 Overall Cascade Cycling Classic, Allie Dragoo
 Youth classification Ladies Tour of Norway, Lisa Klein
 Overall Giro della Toscana Int. Femminile – Memorial Michela Fanini, Ashleigh Moolman
 Points classification, Ashleigh Moolman 
 Mountains classification, Ashleigh Moolman
 Youth classification, Cecilie Uttrup Ludwig
Prologue, Lisa Klein
Stage 2, Ashleigh Moolman
 Youth classification UCI Women's World Tour, Cecilie Uttrup Ludwig
Telkom 947 Cycle Challenge, Ashleigh Moolman

2018 – Cervélo–Bigla Pro Cycling
 Mountain classification Semana Ciclista Valenciana, Ashleigh Moolman 
 Provincial Time Trial Championship West-Vlaanderen, Ann-Sophie Duyck
La Classique Morbihan, Ashleigh Moolman
Grand Prix de Plumelec-Morbihan Dames, Ashleigh Moolman
Stage 5 The Women's Tour, Lotta Lepisto
 National Time Trial Championships, Ann-Sophie Duyck
 National Time Trial Championships, Nicole Hanselmann
 National Time Trial Championships, Cecilie Uttrup Ludwig
 National Time Trial Championships, Lotta Lepisto
 National Road Race Championships, Lotta Lepisto
Prologue Giro Toscana Int. Femminile – Memorial Michela Fanini, Lotta Lepisto

2019 – Bigla Pro Cycling
Pan American Championships, Time Trial, Leah Thomas
SwissEver GP Cham-Hagendorn, Julie Leth
Stage 3 (ITT) Tour de Bretagne Féminin, Mikayla Harvey
Stage 8 Giro Rosa, Elizabeth Banks

2020 – Bigla–Katusha
 National Road Championship, Niamh Fisher-Black
 U23 National Road Championship, Niamh Fisher-Black

Bigla
Team Bigla